The City College "stampede" was a crowd crush event that occurred on December 29, 1991, in the City College of New York gymnasium during a charity basketball game headlined by hip hop celebrities Puff Daddy and Heavy D. Outside of the event, crowds were able to break at least one glass door leading into the gymnasium lobby. The crowd then rushed the lobby and down a short staircase that led to the gymnasium. However, a set of doors at the bottom of the stairs opened inward into the lobby, not outward into the gymnasium, and nine people were crushed to death at the bottom of staircase, while 29 others were injured. No criminal charges were filed following the incident, although multiple wrongful death and personal injury lawsuits were filed.

See also

References

1991 in New York City
Disasters in New York City
Human stampedes in the United States
History of New York City
1991 disasters in the United States
December 1991 events in the United States
City College of New York
Hamilton Heights, Manhattan